Pu Qijuan (born 1960) is a female Chinese former international table tennis player.

She won two medals at the 1981 World Table Tennis Championships in the women's doubles (silver medal) with Tong Ling and mixed doubles (bronze medal) with Huang Liang. Two years later she won a bronze at the 1983 World Table Tennis Championships with Tong Ling.

See also
 List of table tennis players
 List of World Table Tennis Championships medalists

References

Chinese female table tennis players
Living people
1960 births
Table tennis players from Shanghai
Medalists at the 1982 Asian Games
Asian Games gold medalists for China
Asian Games silver medalists for China
Asian Games medalists in table tennis
World Table Tennis Championships medalists
Table tennis players at the 1982 Asian Games